This is a List of accidents and incidents involving Douglas DC-3  variants that have taken place in the year 1945, including aircraft based on the DC-3 airframe such as the Douglas C-47 Skytrain and Lisunov Li-2. Military accidents are included; and hijackings and incidents of terrorism are covered, although acts of war are outside the scope of this list.

January 8 United States Army Air Forces Air Transport Command C-47 41-7797 crashed in India, three killed.

January 10 American Airlines DC-3 NC25684 hit a hill during an instrument approach at Burbank, California, United States.

February 23 American Airlines DC-3 NC18142 flew into a mountain near Marion, Virginia, United States.

April 14 Pennsylvania Central DC-3 N25692 flew into a mountain near Morgantown, West Virginia, United States.

June 4 Pan American Airlines DC-3A NC33611 stalled on take-off at Piarco Airport, Port of Spain, Trinidad.

August 5 United States Army Air Forces C-47 41-18505 crashed at Des, Iceland.

September 7 Eastern Airlines DC-3 NC33631 crashed at Florence, South Carolina, United States following a fire.

December 12 United States Army Air Forces C-47 41-38700 crashed probably in Italy.

December 19 RAAF ambulance aircraft A65-83 crashed on or near an island in the Banda Sea during a storm.

December 30 Eastern Airlines DC-3 NC18123 overshot the runway on landing at La Guardia Airport, New York, United States and ended up in Flushing Bay.

See also 
 List of accidents and incidents involving the DC-3 in the 1940s

References

Notes 
 Military versions of the DC-3 were known as C-47 Skytrain, C-48, C-49, C-50, C-51, C-52, C-53 Skytrooper, C-68, C-84, C-117 Super Dakota and YC-129 by the United States Army Air Forces and as the R4D by the United States Navy. In Royal Air Force (and other British Commonwealth air forces') service, these aircraft were known as Dakotas.

1945
DC-3